The Voice of China is a Chinese reality television singing competition broadcast on Zhejiang Television. Based on the original The Voice of Holland, the concept of the series is to find new singing talent (solo or duets) contested by aspiring singers drawn from public auditions. The winner is determined by votes cast by a media judging panel and live audience. They receive a record deal with various labels for winning the competition. The winners of the four seasons have been: Bruce Liang, Li Qi, Diamond Zhang, and Zhang Lei.

The series employs a panel of four coaches who critique the artists' performances and guide their teams of selected artists through the remainder of the season. They also compete to ensure that their act wins the competition, thus making them the winning coach. Members of the coaching panel include Na Ying (season 1–4), Harlem Yu (season 1–2, 4), Yang Kun (season 1, 3), Liu Huan (season 1), A-mei (season 2), Wang Feng (season 2–4), Chyi Chin (season 3) and Jay Chou (season 4).

The show began airing under the name of The Voice of China on 13 July 2012. In 2016, contractual disputes arose between Talpa Holding, the owner of the show's format and franchise, and Canxing Production, the show's producing company. It was revealed the former has inked a joint venture with another producing company, Talent International, to produce the upcoming seasons of the show. In a response to the dispute and prevent copyright breaches, Canxing Productions launched Sing! China, a rebranded version of the show which the producers claimed to come with an original format, though it still shares several similarities with The Voice of China.

Format
The series consists of three main phases: a blind audition, a battle phase, and live performance shows. The four judges / coaches choose teams of contestants through a blind audition process. Each judge has the length of the auditioner's performance to decide if he or she wants that singer on his or her team. If two or more judges want the same singer (as happens frequently), the singer has the final choice of coach.

Each team of singers is mentored and developed by its respective coach. In the second stage, called the battle phase, coaches have two of their team members battle against each other directly by singing the same song together, with the coach choosing which team member to advance from each of individual "battles" into the first live round.  Within that first live round, the surviving four acts from each team again compete head-to-head, with public votes determining the best of four acts from each team that will advance to the final eight, while the coach chooses which of the remaining three acts comprises the other performer remaining on the team.

In the final phase, the remaining contestants compete against each other in live broadcasts. The audience and the coaches have equal say in deciding who moves on to the final 4 phase. With one contestant remaining for each coach, the four contestants will compete against each other in the final round with the outcome decided solely by public vote. However, in Season 4, there may be multiple contestants for a coach to enter the Grand Final, or may be no contestants for the respective coaches.

The Voice of China (season 1–4) was sponsored by JDB Group and Pechoin.

Coaches' timeline 
Hu Qiaohua has hosted all four seasons.

Coaches

Coaches' advisors

Season 1
 Team Harlem – Wang Chi-ping
 Team Liu Huan – San Bao
 Team Na Ying – Wang Feng
 Team Yang Kun – Coco Lee

Season 2
 Team A-mei – Aadia's, Leehom Wang
 Team Harlem – Steve Chow, Ella Chen
 Team Na Ying – Wu Tsing-Fong
 Team Wang Feng – Jia Yinan

Season 3
 Team Chyi Chin – Chyi Yu, Karen Mok
 Team Na Ying – Jeff Chang
 Team Wang Feng – Zheng Jun
 Team Yang Kun – Jam Hsiao

Season 4
 Team Harlem – JJ Lin
 Team Jay – A-mei
 Team Na Ying – Li Jian
 Team Wang Feng – G.E.M.

Series overview

  Team Harlem Yu
  Team A-mei
  Team Liu Huan
  Team Wang Feng
  Team Na Ying
  Team Chyi Chin
  Team Yang Kun
  Team Jay Chou

Season synopses
Names in bold type indicate the winner of the season.

Season 1

The first season of The Voice of China premiered on 13 July 2012, and concluded on 30 September. The coaching panel consisted of Liu Huan, Na Ying, Yang Kun, and Harlem Yu. Hu Qiaohua as the host.

Each coach was allowed to advance four top to the live shows:

Four finalists were advanced to the final round. Bruce Liang was announced as the winner of the season, while Momo Wu, Jike Junyi, and Kim Ji-mun placed second, third, and fourth, respectively.

Season 2

Season two premiered on 12 July 2013, and concluded on 7 October 2013. The coaching panel was modified, with A-mei and Wang Feng replacing Liu and Yang. This is the only season with two female coaches, which are A-mei and Na Ying. Hu continued appearing as the host of the show.

Each coach was allowed to advance four top to the live shows:

Four finalists were advanced to the final round. Li Qi was announced as the winner of the season, while Zhang Hengyuan, Xuan Xuan, and Jin Runji placed second, third, and fourth, respectively.

Season 3

Season three premiered on 18 July 2014 and concluded on 7 October 2014. Na and Wang return as coaches for their third and second season respectively, along with Yang who returns after a one season break, and Chyi Chin completes the panel as a new coach.

Each coach was allowed to advance four top to the live shows:

Four finalists were advanced to the final round. Diamond Zhang was announced as the winner of the season, while Perhat Khaliq, Yu Feng, and Qin Yuzi placed second, third, and fourth, respectively.

Season 4

Season four premiered on 17 July 2015 and concluded on 7 October 2015. Na and Wang return as coaches for their fourth and third season respectively, along with Yu who returns after a one season break, and Jay Chou completes the panel as a new coach.

Each coach was allowed to advance four top to the live shows:

Five finalists were advanced to the final round. Zhang Lei was announced as the winner of the season, while Tifa Chen, Tan Xuanyuan, Bei Bei and Leon Lee placed second, third, fourth and fifth, respectively.

References

External links 
 

 
Chinese music television series
Chinese-language television shows
Zhejiang Television original programming